Papa's Got a Brand New Bag is a compilation album by American musician James Brown. It consists of songs taken from albums throughout his career with King Records. Also included are "Papa's Got a Brand New Bag" (previously released as a single) and "Have Mercy Baby" (first released on the compilation Good, Good, Twistin' and later as a single). The album was released in 1965, by King.

Track listing

References

James Brown albums
1965 albums
Albums produced by James Brown
King Records (United States) albums